Adventure, Michigan was a mining town in Ontonagon County in the U.S. state of Michigan.  The mine was opened in 1850 and a post office operated in the town from 1851 to 1860.

Sources 

Ghost towns in Michigan
Former populated places in Ontonagon County, Michigan
Populated places established in 1850
1850 establishments in Michigan